Situ Huimin (16 February 1910 – 4 April 1987), was a Chinese film director, screenwriter and actor, born in Kaiping, Guangdong.

He joined the Communist Youth League in 1925 and the Communist Party of China in 1927. The next year, he went to Japan to study arts and there, he became interested in filmmaking. After returning to China in 1930, he actively participated in left-wing theater movement. Then, he worked as set designer and sound engineer in film industry. His debut as a film director was Spirit of Freedom, produced by Diantong Film Company in 1935. Subsequently, he joined the Lianhua Film Company in Shanghai. After the outbreak of the war he went to Hong Kong, where he continued to work both in film and in theater. During this period he created couple of anti-Japanese films. In 1943 he worked on newsreels in Chongqing. After the war, he helped to organize the Kunlun Film Company. Then, he left to the United States to study film technology and management. He came back in 1950s, to continue to work in China's film industry, holding many important offices for the government. He died in Beijing on April 4, 1987.

Selected filmography as a director
 Spirit of Freedom (1935)
 Lianhua Symphony (1937) a segment in an anthology film
 The Blood-stained Baoshan Fortress (1938, Hong Kong)
 Hometown Cloud (1940, Hong Kong)
 Song of Retribution (1941, Hong Kong)

References

External links

Situ Huimin at the Chinese Movie Database

1910 births
1987 deaths
Film directors from Guangdong
Screenwriters from Guangdong
People from Kaiping
Male actors from Guangdong
Writers from Jiangmen
Chinese emigrants to Hong Kong
20th-century screenwriters